Jānis Joņevs (born 21. March 1980 in Jelgava) is a Latvian writer, copywriter and translator from french. After studying at the local Gymnasium in Jelgava, he went to Riga for his higher education and earned a Master's degree from the Latvian Academy of Culture. Joņevs is best known for his debut novel Doom 94 (Jelgava 94) which was a bestseller upon its release in 2013. The book later won the European Union Prize for Literature. It was translated into many languages and made into a feature film.

References

External links
 

1980 births
Latvian writers
Living people
Latvian Academy of Culture alumni
20th-century Latvian people
21st-century Latvian people